Philippe de Champaigne (26 May 1602 – 12 August 1674) was a Brabançon-born French Baroque era painter, a major exponent of the French school. He was a founding member of the Académie royale de peinture et de sculpture in Paris, the premier art institution in France in the eighteenth century.

Life and work
Born of a poor family in Brussels (Duchy of Brabant, Southern Netherlands), during the reign of the Archduke Albert and Isabella, Champaigne was a pupil of the landscape painter Jacques Fouquières. In 1621 he moved to Paris, where he worked with Nicolas Poussin on the decoration of the Palais du Luxembourg under the direction of Nicolas Duchesne, whose daughter he would eventually marry. According to Houbraken, Duchesne was angry at Champaigne for becoming more popular than he was at court, and this is why Champaigne returned to Brussels to live with his brother. 

It was only after he received news of Duchesne's death that he returned to marry his daughter. After the death of his protector Duchesne, Champaigne worked for the Queen Mother, Marie de Medicis, for whom he participated in the decoration of the Luxembourg Palace. He made several paintings for the Notre Dame Cathedral in Paris, dating from 1638. He also drew several cartoons for tapestries. He was made first painter of the Queen with a pension of 1200 pounds. He also decorated the Carmelite Church of Faubourg Saint-Jacques, one of the favorite churches of the Queen Mother.

This site was destroyed during the French Revolution, but there are several paintings now preserved in museums, that were part of the original design. The Presentation in the Temple is in Dijon, the  Resurrection of Lazarus is in Grenoble and the Assumption of the Virgin is in the Louvre. 

He also worked for Cardinal Richelieu, for whom he decorated the Palais Cardinal, the dome of the Sorbonne and other buildings. Champaigne was the only artist who was allowed to paint Richelieu enrobed as a cardinal, which he did eleven times. He was a founding member of the Académie de peinture et de sculpture in 1648.
Later in his life (from 1640 onwards), he came under the influence of Jansenism. After his paralysed daughter was allegedly miraculously cured at the nunnery of Port-Royal, he painted the celebrated but atypical picture Ex-Voto de 1662, now in the Louvre, which represents the artist's daughter with Mother-Superior Agnès Arnauld.

Career

Champaigne produced a very large number of paintings, mainly religious works and portraits. Influenced by Rubens at the beginning of his career, his style later became more austere. Philippe de Champaigne remains an exceptional painter thanks to the brilliance of the colors in his paintings and the stern strength of his compositions.

He portrayed the entire French court, the French high nobility, royalty, high members of the church and the state, parliamentarians and architects, and other notable people. His portrait of the poet Vincent Voiture was created around 1649 as the frontispiece for Voiture's published Works (published posthumously in 1650). The portrait is highly unusual in that Champaigne later reworked it as a portrait of a religious figure, Saint Louis (King Louis IX), to enable Voiture's daughter to keep it with her when she entered a convent.

In depicting their faces, he refused to show a transitory expression, instead capturing the psychological essence of the person.

His works can be seen in public buildings, private collections, churches such as Val-de-Grâce, Sorbonne, Saint Severin, Saint-Merri, Saint-Médard and in the Basilica of Notre-Dame du Port in Clermont-Ferrand.

Champaigne was prominent enough in his time as to be mentioned in Cyrano de Bergerac in a line by Ragueneau referencing Cyrano: "Truly, I should not look to find his portrait By the grave hand of Philippe de Champagne."

His pupils were his nephew Jean Baptiste de Champaigne, William Faithorne, Jean Morin, and Nicolas de Plattemontagne. During his last period Champaigne painted mainly religious subjects and family members. He died in Paris in 1674.

Gallery

References

External links

 PhilippeDeChampaigne.org, 98 works by Philippe de Champaigne
 ScholarsResource.com, Paintings of Philippe de Champaigne

1602 births
1674 deaths
Artists from Brussels
Jansenists
French Baroque painters
Flemish Baroque painters